Škocjan (in older sources also Škocijan) is small settlement east of Domžale in the Upper Carniola region of Slovenia.

Church

The local church is dedicated to Saint Cantius.

References

External links

Škocjan on Geopedia

Populated places in the Municipality of Domžale